Dallas Grider (December 5, 1944 - May 11, 2022) is a former American football player and coach.

Played two seasons as linebacker for the UCLA Bruins, including the 1966 Rose Bowl victory over Michigan State.  Dallas Grider, who recovered the 2nd quarter onside kick that led to UCLA's second touchdown in the Rose Bowl, also recovered the onside kick in the UCLA–USC game that led to the Bruins' winning touchdown and a trip to the Rose Bowl.

Head coach for West High School, Bakersfield where he built a winning tradition that dominated the Central Section for many years. While at West High he compiled a 77–7–2 record and won back-to-back valley championships.

Head football coach for the Bakersfield College Renegades.

Exceptional football player at Arvin High School and Bakersfield College.

References

Living people
American football linebackers
Bakersfield Renegades football coaches
UCLA Bruins football players
High school football coaches in California
1944 births